The 1967–68 season was Port Vale's 56th season of football in the English Football League, and their third successive season (fourth overall) in the Fourth Division. A poor season saw them battle to mid-table in order to avoid the re-election zone. Yet it would be off-the-field developments that would worry Vale supporters the most. An FA/Football League Joint-Inquiry investigated the club as club officials were forced to admit several breaches of the rules in regard to payment of players. The result was expulsion from the League, however before the start of the following season a vote of 39 to 9 allowed the club to be immediately readmitted to the competition. The whole saga was rather ironic, as the club re-entered the League in 1919 after Leeds City were expelled over illegal payments to their players. On the playing front it was the final season of both Harry Poole and Terry Miles' careers.

Overview

Fourth Division
The pre-season saw the departure of Terry Alcock to Blackpool, after the club 'reluctantly' accepted a £25,000 offer. In came £35-a-week striker Roy Chapman from Lincoln City and forward Mick Morris from Oxford United. In August there was a pre-season tour of Czechoslovakia to help with fitness, as the players also toured the spa at Luhačovice, the wine cellars at Čelákovice, as well as a giant footwear factory. They played friendly games with Gottwaldov and Jisara Skutec.

The season opened with seven games without a win, with just three goals scored. Stanley Matthews then returned to Czechoslovakia on business, much to the dismay of supporters. In came skilful midfielder John Green, who made a 'superb' debut in a 2–0 defeat at high-flying Aldershot. By now Vale were bottom of the league, but a remarkable turnaround then saw Vale hit four goals in each of their next four home games with the useful partnership of Cullerton and Chapman, and the skill of Green. Harry Poole picked up an injury and 'the spell was broken' with a 2–1 defeat in Burslem to league leaders Bradford City. In November Vale again suffered, and more problems came as the Football League began an examination into the club's books over alleged breaches of rules in regard to payment of players. Back on the pitch, Roy Sproson made his 700th appearance in a 1–1 draw with Newport County at Somerton Park. The next month held more financial problems, as lifelong Vale supporter and self-styled 'holiday camp king' Graham Bourne was denied a seat on the board despite buying up 13,000 shares – Chairman Pinfold stated 'we must proceed cautiously' and Bourne quickly sold his shares. On the field, the "Valiants" improved with a seven-match unbeaten run to take them into mid-table, their run was helped by the arrival of Bill Asprey from Oldham Athletic for £2,000.

In January the League's investigation resulted in a Football Association commission to investigate six charges: numerous amateurs had received a weekly wage; associate schoolboys played for the club despite this being against the rules; extra bonuses were offered for reaching the Second Round of the League Cup; John Ritchie had received illegal payments; Clint Boulton and Gordon Logan had received illegal bonuses; and that young players had been given gifts in breach of league rules. With this hanging over the club's head form suffered, and Jimmy Hill left the club to become player-manager of Derry City. Stan Steele returned from South Africa and joined on a month-long trial, however he only managed to score an 'incredible' own goal by lobbing Stuart Sharratt in a 3–0 loss to Aldershot. On 20 February the FA-Football League joint-inquiry 'severely censured' Port Vale officials at Lancaster Gate after the officials admitted the charges held against them. The club received a £2,000 fine and a recommendation that they be expelled from the league, a month later on 6 March another £2,000 fine was issued and the club were informed that they would be expelled from the Football League at the end of the season. The club's officials were 'shocked and appalled' at the 'savage penalties', and Stoke City chairman Albert Henshall also called the punishment 'severe'. The club changed the leadership structure and defiantly stated their aim to win promotion from the Fourth Division, and also their decision to appoint a new player-manager to lead them to such an aim. On the pitch, Vale hovered uncomfortably above the re-election zone, and only finished above the re-election zone with a 1–0 win over Lincoln City at Sincil Bank on the final day.

They finished in eighteenth position with 39 points, three points clear of the re-election zones. They finished ahead of Rochdale and Exeter City by one point; ahead of York City by three points; ahead of Chester by seven points; ahead of Workington by eight points; and a massive sixteen points clear of Bradford Park Avenue. Recording just two away wins all season, their home form was also poor. Roy Chapman had excelled however, his 25 goals in all competitions the highest since 1960–61.

Finances
On the financial side, a loss of £6,279 had been made. Poor attendances reduced gate receipts by almost £5,000, though expenditure was cut by over £6,000. The club's total debt stood at £168,151. Seven players were given free transfers, including youngsters Alex Donald and Malcolm MacKenzie; as well as club veterans Terry Miles and Harry Poole – who had almost thirty years and some 716 league appearances for the Vale between them. Developments at the club included the opening of Vale Shop at the Hamil End, and the appointment of 'young... modern track-suited' Gordon Lee as manager. The club were in dire straits however, and Lee had to persuade Sproson to continue playing. On 2 May, "Port Vale Select XI "played a "Midlands All Stars" team for a "Valiant Vale" fund game to raise money for the club; Tom Finney and Nat Lofthouse were amongst the stars of the Vale team, alongside management duo Stanley Matthews and Jackie Mudie.

Cup competitions
In the FA Cup, Chester knocked the Vale out at the First Round with a 2–1 victory in the snow at Vale Park.

In the League Cup, the "Valiants" reached the Second Round after a Mick Cullerton hat-trick in a 3–0 win over Chester at home. Defeat then came at Fratton Park to Second Division Portsmouth after Clint Boulton 'gave away two needless penalties'. It was the first time the club progressed further in the League Cup than in the FA Cup – an occurrence that would not be repeated until 1983–84.

League table

Results
Port Vale's score comes first

Football League Fourth Division

Results by matchday

Matches

FA Cup

League Cup

Player statistics

Appearances

Top scorers

Transfers

Transfers in

Transfers out

References
Specific

General

Port Vale F.C. seasons
Port Vale